This is a complete list of the suburbs located in the Central Coast region of New South Wales, Australia. Suburbs are listed here if they are in the Central Coast region and are listed on the Geographical Names Register as suburbs. The area is formed by the boundaries of Central Coast Council, which was a product of the merger of City of Gosford and Wyong Shire in 2016.

A

Alison
Avoca Beach

B

Bar Point
Bateau Bay
Bensville
Berkeley Vale
Blackwall
Blue Bay
Blue Haven
Booker Bay
Bouddi 
Budgewoi
Budgewoi Peninsula
Buff Point
Bushells Ridge

C
Calga
Canton Beach
Central Mangrove
Chain Valley Bay
Charmhaven
Cheero Point
Chittaway Bay
Chittaway Point
Cogra Bay
Colongra
Copacabana
Crangan Bay

D

Daleys Point
Davistown
Dooralong
Doyalson
Doyalson North
Durren Durren

E

East Gosford
Empire Bay
Erina
Erina Heights
Ettalong Beach

F

Forresters Beach
Fountaindale

G

Glenning Valley
Glenworth Valley
Gorokan
Gosford
Green Point
Greengrove
Gunderman
Gwandalan

H

Halekulani
Halloran
Hamlyn Terrace
Hardys Bay
Holgate
Horsfield Bay

J

Jilliby

K

Kangy Angy
Kanwal
Kariong
Kiar
Killarney Vale
Killcare
Killcare Heights
Kincumber
Kincumber South
Kingfisher Shores
Koolewong
Kulnura

L

Lake Haven
Lake Munmorah
Lemon Tree
Lisarow
Little Jilliby
Little Wobby
Long Jetty
Lower Mangrove

M

MacMasters Beach
Magenta
Mangrove Creek
Mangrove Mountain
Mannering Park
Mardi
Marlow
Matcham
Mooney Mooney
Mooney Mooney Creek
Mount Elliot
Mount White

N

Narara
Niagara Park
Norah Head
Noraville
North Avoca
North Gosford

O

Ourimbah

P

Palm Grove
Palmdale
Patonga
Pearl Beach
Peats Ridge
Phegans Bay
Picketts Valley
Point Clare
Point Frederick
Pretty Beach

R

Ravensdale
Rocky Point

S

St Huberts Island
San Remo
Saratoga
Shelly Beach
Somersby
Spencer
Springfield
Summerland Point

T

Tacoma
Tacoma South
Tascott
Terrigal
The Entrance
The Entrance North
Toowoon Bay
Toukley
Tuggerah
Tuggerawong
Tumbi Umbi

U

Umina Beach
Upper Mangrove

W

Wadalba
Wagstaffe
Wallarah
Wamberal
Warnervale
Watanobbi
Wendoree Park
West Gosford
Wondabyne
Woongarrah
Woy Woy
Woy Woy Bay
Wyoming
Wyong
Wyong Creek
Wyongah

Y

Yarramalong
Yattalunga

Central Coast
Central Coast